Jörg Weißflog (born October 12, 1956) is a former international football goalkeeper for the East Germany.

The goalkeeper was during the 1980s the first-choice between the post for BSG Wismut Aue in the Oberliga. Weißflog won in this decade 15 caps for East Germany.

References

External links
 
 
 

1956 births
Living people
People from Stollberg
East German footballers
German footballers
East Germany international footballers
Association football goalkeepers
FC Erzgebirge Aue players
Chemnitzer FC players
Footballers from Saxony